The Communauté de communes Loches Sud Touraine is a communauté de communes, an intercommunal structure, in the Indre-et-Loire department, in the Centre-Val de Loire region, central France. It was created on 1 January 2017 by the merger of the former communautés de communes of Loches Développement, Montrésor, Grand Ligueillois and Touraine du Sud. Its area is 1809.5 km2, and its population was 51,376 in 2018. Its seat is in Loches.

Composition
The communauté de communes consists of the following 67 communes:

Abilly
Azay-sur-Indre
Barrou
Beaulieu-lès-Loches
Beaumont-Village
Betz-le-Château
Bossay-sur-Claise
Bossée
Bournan
Boussay
Bridoré
La Celle-Guenand
La Celle-Saint-Avant
Chambon
Chambourg-sur-Indre
Chanceaux-près-Loches
La Chapelle-Blanche-Saint-Martin
Charnizay
Chaumussay
Chédigny
Chemillé-sur-Indrois
Ciran
Civray-sur-Esves
Cormery
Cussay
Descartes
Dolus-le-Sec
Draché
Esves-le-Moutier
Ferrière-Larçon
Ferrière-sur-Beaulieu
Genillé
Le Grand-Pressigny
La Guerche
Le Liège
Ligueil
Loches
Loché-sur-Indrois
Louans
Le Louroux
Manthelan
Marcé-sur-Esves
Montrésor
Mouzay
Neuilly-le-Brignon
Nouans-les-Fontaines
Orbigny
Paulmy
Perrusson
Le Petit-Pressigny
Preuilly-sur-Claise
Reignac-sur-Indre
Saint-Flovier
Saint-Hippolyte
Saint-Jean-Saint-Germain
Saint-Quentin-sur-Indrois
Saint-Senoch
Sennevières
Sepmes
Tauxigny-Saint-Bauld
Tournon-Saint-Pierre
Varennes
Verneuil-sur-Indre
Villedômain
Villeloin-Coulangé
Vou
Yzeures-sur-Creuse

Politics and government

Intercommunal representation

References

Commune communities in France
Intercommunalities of Indre-et-Loire